The Sceptre was an 80-gun Bucentaure-class 80-gun ship of the line of the French Navy, designed by Sané. The Captain of the ship was Captain Samuel James Ballard.

References

 Jean-Michel Roche, Dictionnaire des Bâtiments de la flotte de guerre française de Colbert à nos jours, tome I

Ships of the line of the French Navy
Ships built in France
Bucentaure-class ships of the line
1810 ships